The Bulgarian Mint (Монетен двор, Moneten dvor), established in 1952, is solely responsible for the production of legal tender coins in Bulgaria. It is owned by the Bulgarian National Bank.

The Bulgarian Mint also produces high quality gold and silver jubilees, medals, orders and other insignia of honour, necklaces, seals, mint collector sets and custom made badges, pins etc. The Mint is officially appointed to produce Bulgaria's orders and medals by the Presidency of the Republic of Bulgaria, the Ministries of Defence and Internal Affairs.

Together with the Bulgarian National Military Museum, the Mint hosts the Exhibition of Bulgarian Orders.

See also

 Bulgarian lev
 Bulgarian Commemorative coins

External links
  Bulgarian Mint

Mints (currency)
Mints of Europe
Currencies of Bulgaria
Bulgarian National Bank
Manufacturing companies based in Sofia
1952 establishments in Bulgaria
Government agencies established in 1952